The Rio de Janeiro was a Brazilian single-engine, biplane utility aircraft.

Design and development
It was based on the Caudron G.3. Built almost entirely of wood and canvas, it had three seats. It has a Gnome et Rhône engine, of the push–pull configuration, with a fixed pitch propeller made of wood. The reinforced landing gear included four wheels and two fixed skids, with a rear skid. It was nicknamed Cochon (in English: Hog).

Operational history
First flew daily, since the first flight, and was maintained without any changes, which proved its safety. Moreover, since its departure from the Lage & Irmãos workshops, it had already transported 200 passengers and made a Rio de Janeiro-São Paulo air bridge trip. Another important factor is that with two passengers on board, it reached an altitude of 2000 meters in 22 minutes.

Specifications

References

Further reading
 Susana Alexandria, 1910 - O Primeiro Voo do Brasil, Ed. Aleph, São Paulo, 2010. .

External links
 Lafay Rio de Janeiro (Brazilian Air Force)

1920s Brazilian civil utility aircraft
1920s Brazilian experimental aircraft
1920s Brazilian civil aircraft
Single-engined tractor aircraft
Biplanes
Aircraft first flown in 1920